Tanzania Social Support Foundation (TSSF) is a non-governmental organization which is primarily and duly registered under the Non-Governmental Organisations' Act, [Cap.56 R.E 2019] of the Laws of the United Republic of Tanzania. The TSSF is legally a body corporate that is mandated to operate in whole of the part of the United Republic of Tanzania as the National oriented Non-Governmental Organization. Since its permanent incorporation on 7 March 2014, the TSSF has been focusing on promotion of Diplomacy, Economic Development, Education, Environment, Good Governance, Healthcare, Social Support and Tourism.

TSSF and Civil Society Empowerment in African Continent 
Tanzania Social Support Foundation has been a base for empowering the Civil Societies in the African Continent; and it is among the front line Organizations which is advocating for the civil societies' welfare in Africa. In 2015 Tanzania Social Support Foundation managed to invite civil societies across Africa and establish the Pan African Forum of Civil Societies

TSSF and Community Empowerment in Tanzania 
In 2014 Tanzania Social Support Foundation started to run a life skills training programs to youths across the Universities and Colleges in Tanzania for the purpose of preparing Tanzanian youth graduate be ready to face the challenges related to unemployment and in November 2014 the Organization held a National Youth Summit with the theme Understanding Gas and Oil Economy: Policies and its implications to youths of Tanzania
Also TSSF runs a Center for Development in South - Eastern Tanzania (CDSET) which is special for empowering the residents of Mtwara and Lindi Regions of Tanzania in both economic, social, and cultural dimensions of life.

TSSF Higher Education Fund 
In 2017, the Tanzania Social Support Foundation launched its Higher Education Fund that is dedicated to offer scholarships and tuition waivers to over 50,000 students of the higher learning institutions as a way to serve all those who appear to miss the educational loans from the Government of the United Republic of Tanzania for which the fund is set to assist the student - citizens of the United Republic of Tanzania who are academically gifted but they fail to access the higher education due to their financial situation as they are originated from the very low-income families and disadvantaged backgrounds.

Consortium of Social Support Foundations 
On 6 January 2018 the TSSF launched its Private International Civil Society that is known as Consortium of Social Support Foundations with the main objective of advocating for the doctrine of social support across the world

List of directors-general of the Tanzania Social Support Foundation

References

Organizations established in 2011
2011 establishments in Tanzania
Foundations based in Tanzania
Charities based in Tanzania
Investment promotion agencies
Economic development organizations